Michel Delacroix is a Belgian politician. He was elected to the Belgian Senate in 2007.

Being blind, he was from 1990 until 1995 the vice-president of the Braille League (:fr:La Ligue Braille; :nl:Brailleliga), a Belgian non-profit helping visually impaired people.

Notes

Living people
Year of birth missing (living people)
National Front (Belgium) politicians
Members of the Belgian Federal Parliament